Protopyknosia is an extinct clade of archosauriform reptiles from the Late Triassic of India and the United States. First identified by Sterling Nesbitt et al. in 2021, the clade contains two genera: Kranosaura and Triopticus. Members of Protopyknosia characteristically have an unusually domed head reminiscent of the later pachycephalosaurian dinosaurs in an example of convergent evolution.

References 

Prehistoric archosauriforms
Late Triassic extinctions
Taxa named by Sankar Chatterjee
Taxa named by Jack Horner
Taxa named by Sterling Nesbitt
Taxa named by Michelle R. Stocker